Central Sparks are a women's cricket team that represent the West Midlands region, one of eight regional hubs in English domestic women's cricket. They play their home matches at Edgbaston and New Road. They are captained by Evelyn Jones and coached by Lloyd Tennant. The team is partnered with Warwickshire, Worcestershire, Herefordshire, Staffordshire and Shropshire.

History
In 2020, women's cricket in England was restructured, creating eight new 'regional hub' teams, with the intention of playing both 50-over and 20-over cricket. Central Sparks were one of the sides created under this structure, representing the West Midlands and partnered with Warwickshire, Worcestershire, Herefordshire, Staffordshire and Shropshire. The side was to be captained by Evelyn Jones and coached by Lloyd Tennant.  Due to the COVID-19 pandemic, the 2020 season was truncated, and only 50-over cricket was played, in the Rachael Heyhoe Flint Trophy. Central Sparks finished second in the North Group of the competition, winning three of their six games but failing to progress to the final. At the end of the season, five Sparks players were given full-time domestic contracts, the first of their kind in England: Evelyn Jones, Marie Kelly, Issy Wong, Emily Arlott and Gwenan Davies.

The following season, 2021, Sparks competed in both the Rachael Heyhoe Flint Trophy and the newly-formed Twenty20 competition, the Charlotte Edwards Cup. In the Charlotte Edwards Cup the side finished third in their group, winning three of their six matches. In the Rachael Heyhoe Flint Trophy, Central Sparks qualified for the knockout stages of the tournament, finishing third in the group of eight with five wins from their seven matches. During the group stages, Amy Jones hit the highest score of the tournament, scoring 163* against Western Storm, whilst Emily Arlott recorded the best individual bowling figures of the tournament against Southern Vipers, taking 5/29 including a hat-trick. In the play-off, however, the side lost to Northern Diamonds by 6 wickets to be eliminated from the competition. In 2022, they reached the final of the Charlotte Edwards Cup after finishing second in Group A and beating South East Stars in the semi-final. However, they lost to Southern Vipers in the final. Sparks batter Amy Jones was the leading run-scorer in the tournament, with 289 runs, and was named the PCA Player of the Tournament. In July 2022, the side launched the West Midlands Regional Cup, to aid the development of players playing for county sides in the region. The side finished fifth in the group of eight in the 2022 Rachael Heyhoe Flint Trophy.

Home grounds

Players

Current squad
As per 2022 season.
 No. denotes the player's squad number, as worn on the back of their shirt.
  denotes players with international caps.

Academy
The Central Sparks Academy team plays against other regional academies in friendly and festival matches across various formats. The Academy selects players from across the West Midlands region, and includes some players who are also in the first team squad. Players in the 2022/23 Academy are listed below:

Coaching staff

 Head coach: Lloyd Tennant
 Regional Director: Laura Macleod
 Team Operations Manager: Beth Gaskell
 Physiotherapist: Jill Chapman
 Assistant coach: Dominic Ostler
 Team Doctor: Kim Gregory

As of the 2022 season.

Seasons

Rachael Heyhoe Flint Trophy

Charlotte Edwards Cup

Statistics

Rachael Heyhoe Flint Trophy

 Abandoned matches are counted as NR (no result)
 Win or loss by super over or boundary count are counted as tied.

Charlotte Edwards Cup

 Abandoned matches are counted as NR (no result)
 Win or loss by super over or boundary count are counted as tied.

Records

Rachael Heyhoe Flint Trophy
Highest team total: 296/9, v Lightning on 18 September 2021.
Lowest (completed) team total: 144 v Northern Diamonds on 29 August 2020.
Highest individual score: 163*, Amy Jones v Western Storm on 31 May 2021.
Best individual bowling analysis: 5/29, Emily Arlott v Southern Vipers on 5 June 2021.
Most runs: 857 runs in 20 matches, Evelyn Jones.
Most wickets: 20 wickets in 17 matches, Emily Arlott.

Charlotte Edwards Cup
Highest team total: 170/6, v South East Stars on 18 May 2022.
Lowest (completed) team total: 109/8 v Southern Vipers on 11 June 2022.
Highest individual score: 100*, Marie Kelly v Southern Vipers on 25 August 2021.
Best individual bowling analysis: 4/12, Georgia Davis v Lightning on 10 July 2021.
Most runs: 489 runs in 14 matches, Evelyn Jones.
Most wickets: 14 wickets in 8 matches, Grace Potts.

See also
 Shropshire Women cricket team
 Staffordshire Women cricket team
 Warwickshire Women cricket team
 Worcestershire Women cricket team

References

 
2020 establishments in England
Sport in Birmingham, West Midlands
Warwickshire County Cricket Club
Worcestershire County Cricket Club
Cricket in Worcestershire
Cricket clubs established in 2020
English Domestic Women's Cricket Regional Hub teams